Asbestos Convention, 1986 is  an International Labour Organization Convention, adopted at the 72nd  session of the International Labour Conference.

It was established in 1986, with the preamble stating:
Having decided upon the adoption of certain proposals with regard to safety in the use of asbestos,...

Ratifications 
, the convention has been ratified by 35 states from all continents.

References

External links
Full text at ILO
Ratifications

International Labour Organization conventions
Health treaties
Treaties concluded in 1986
Treaties entered into force in 1989
Asbestos
Treaties of Australia
Treaties of Belgium
Treaties of Bolivia
Treaties of Bosnia and Herzegovina
Treaties of Brazil
Treaties of Cameroon
Treaties of Canada
Treaties of Chile
Treaties of Colombia
Treaties of Croatia
Treaties of Cyprus
Treaties of Denmark
Treaties of Ecuador
Treaties of Finland
Treaties of Germany
Treaties of Guatemala
Treaties of Japan
Treaties of Kazakhstan
Treaties of South Korea
Treaties of Luxembourg
Treaties of Montenegro
Treaties of Morocco
Treaties of the Netherlands
Treaties of Norway
Treaties of Portugal
Treaties of Russia
Treaties of Serbia and Montenegro
Treaties of Slovenia
Treaties of Spain
Treaties of Sweden
Treaties of Switzerland
Treaties of North Macedonia
Treaties of Uganda
Treaties of Uruguay
Treaties of Zimbabwe
Treaties extended to Greenland
Treaties extended to the Faroe Islands
Occupational safety and health treaties
Chemical safety
1986 in labor relations